Dujam (II) Frankopan ((died 1317), also Dujam II of Krk, was a Croatian noble, an early member of the illustrious House of Frankopan, who took control of the Adriatic Sea's western coast in Croatia, which had been in a personal union with Hungary since 1102. As Count of Krk (or Veglia), he also ruled the area of Modruš and Senj.

Lord of Krk

Dujam II was born into the family, which after 1430 was known as the House of Frankopan, in the middle of the 13th century as the only son of Frederick II, Count of Krk. He was first mentioned by contemporary records in 1279. His father died sometime after 1288, since then Dujam became Lord of Krk and its surrounding areas. He married Ursia from the noble familily Urisni. He had a son, Frederick III.

Following Ladislaus IV's accession to the throne in 1272, Hungary and Croatia were in a state of constant anarchy and several influential lords could manage to govern their territory autonomously by usurping royal prerogatives in their dominion, even after the death of Andrew III (r. 1290–1301) and extinction of the Árpád dynasty. Historian Gyula Kristó listed Dujam among these powerful "oligarchs" or "provincial lords". In 1300, a Venetian source, Liber Pactorum refers to comes Dujam as "hereditary lord of Krk". He also inherited the title podesta of Senj from his father Frederick II.

Already since 1290, he had supported the power aspirations of the Capetian House of Anjou – Charles Martel, then his son Charles Robert – along with the Šubići and Babonići kindreds. In June 1291, Dujam Frankopan and Radoslav Babonić visited the Neapolitan court at the first time. In May 1300, Dujam, among others, personally accompanied Charles Robert from Naples to Hungary, while received land donations (the three littoral counties of Modruš-Rijeka, Vinodol and Gacka župa, where he also owned Otočac Castle after this) by Charles II of Naples, grandfather of the young prince. They arrived to Split (Spalato) in August 1300, where Paul Šubić greeted them. From Split, Šubić escorted Charles to Zagreb where Ugrin Csák also swore loyalty to the prince. After the sudden death of Andrew in early 1301, Charles had to face rival pretenders for the Hungarian throne. The Croatian and Dalmatian lords have assured the continuous contact between Naples and Hungary during the war of succession. For instance, Dujam and Radoslav again traveled to Naples to visit King Charles II and Queen Mary in 1306.

Dujam and his son Frederick III were the only provincial lords, who remained faithful to Charles I, when the King started his unification war against the oligarchs after 1310. Dujam, who died in 1317, and his son successfully avoided open conflict with Charles, who has defeated all provincial domains by 1323.

Relations with Venice 
Dujam's relation with the Republic of Venice was more complicated despite of the vassal and family relationships between the Frankopans and the Venetian aristocracy. In 1308, Doge Pietro Gradenigo prevented Dujam's plan to get a husband in Hungary for his niece, the orphan Zanetta (daughter of the late Leonard Frankopan, Dujam's cousin), who was also a niece of Gradenigo. The doge referred to the "insufferable and perilous conditions in Hungary and its connected territories", when adopted the child himself.

References

Sources 

13th-century Croatian people
14th-century Croatian people
1317 deaths
Dujam 02
13th-century Croatian nobility
14th-century Croatian nobility
13th-century Croatian military personnel
14th-century Croatian military personnel
Oligarchs of the Kingdom of Hungary